Rodrigo Saravia (born 22 February 1993) is a Guatemalan professional footballer who plays as a midfielder for Liga Nacional club Comunicaciones and the Guatemala national team.

Youth and college
Savaria was born in Guatemala City. As a youth in Guatemala, he played for Antigua GFC. He played for Antigua's youth teams for two seasons and was a standout in the midfield before being recruited to play college soccer in the United States. He was recruited by Boston College, Virginia Commonwealth, North Carolina State, and Rutgers, before choosing to play at Florida Gulf Coast.

Saravia immediately stepped into a starting role at FGCU, starting all 19 games his freshman season and being named to the Atlantic Sun All-Freshman Team. He scored his first collegiate goal against USC Upstate on 12 October 2012 in a 1–0 victory for the Eagles. He started against South Florida in the first round of the NCAA Tournament as the Eagles were knocked out on penalties. Saravia did not manage to score during his sophomore season, but was named to the Atlantic Sun All-Conference Second Team while recording two assists and starting all 16 games. He bounced back his junior year, scoring a goal in 19 appearances as the Eagles returned to the NCAA Tournament for the second time in Saravia's college career, where they fell 1–0 to Coastal Carolina. Saravia was named to the Atlantic Sun All-Conference First Team for the first time in his career and also made the A-Sun Academic All-Conference Team. In 2015, his senior season, Saravia notched a career-high three assists in just 13 games, while being named the Atlantic Sun Player of the Year. He made the All-Conference First Team for a second year in a row and was named to the NSCAA All-Region Third Team. FGCU won the Atlantic Sun regular season championship all four years that Saravia played, winning the conference tournament and advancing to the NCAA Tournament in 2012 and 2014. Over four seasons, Saravia made 67 appearances for the Eagles, providing two goals and seven assists.

Club career

Columbus Crew SC
Savaria was one of 59 players invited to the 2016 MLS Combine in Fort Lauderdale, Florida. In the process, he became the first-ever Florida Gulf Coast player invited to the combine and only the third-ever Atlantic Sun player invited to the event since 2007. Columbus Crew SC, the MLS Cup 2015 runners-up, selected him with the 19th overall pick in the 2016 MLS SuperDraft following his performance at the MLS Combine. About the player, head coach Gregg Berhalter said, "He is very poised and controlled, a very smart, simple player, and very good technically.” Saravia was expected to fill a void left by out-of-contract Trinidad and Tobago international Kevan George. On 4 February 2016, it was announced that he had signed a professional contract with the club, becoming the 12th Guatemalan to sign for an MLS club in league history.

Saravia made his professional debut on 16 April 2016 in a 3–2 victory over New York City FC, coming on as a substitute for Mohammed Saeid in the 90+5'. He appeared in the next three games for Crew SC, coming off the bench as a midfielder. On 21 May, Saravia made his first professional appearance as a center back, replacing Gastón Sauro in the 35th minute of a scoreless draw with Toronto FC. In Crew SC's next match, against Real Salt Lake on 28 May, Saravia earned his first start for Columbus. He played the full 90 minutes at center back as Crew SC picked up a 4–3 victory. It would mark his only start of the season. After his return from loan, Saravia made two more appearances for Crew SC, coming off the bench against New England Revolution on 20 August and against Orlando City on 17 September. He finished his first season with Columbus having made 10 appearances on the season, nine coming off the bench.

On 2 March 2017, Crew SC announced that they were sending Saravia on loan to IK Frej. While on loan, his number 19 shirt was given to Kekuta Manneh, who the club acquired in a trade from Vancouver Whitecaps FC. Saravia spent the entire 2017 season on loan in Sweden, and did not return to Columbus until after the roster freeze, making him unable to appear in the postseason.

On 1 December 2017, Columbus announced that they had declined Saravia's contract option, ending his two-year stay in the black and gold. His departure, along with Marshall Hollingsworth also having his option declined, meant that none of Crew SC's five draft picks in the 2016 MLS SuperDraft remained with the team for the 2018 season. Saravia finished his career in Columbus having made 12 appearances across all competitions.

Loan to Pittsburgh Riverhounds
On 10 August 2016, it was announced that Saravia and two teammates were loaned to Crew SC's USL affiliates, Pittsburgh Riverhounds, on a match-by-match basis. He made his Riverhounds debut the same day against FC Montreal in a 4–1 defeat. Saravia made his only other appearance for Pittsburgh three days later, on 13 August against Bethlehem Steel FC. He came on as a substitute, playing for 27 minutes in the 2–1 victory for the Riverhounds.

Loan to IK Frej
On 2 March 2017, IK Frej of the Superettan announced they had acquired Saravia on a season-long loan from Columbus. He appeared for Frej in a preseason friendly against AFC Eskilstuna, but underwent surgery for a broken fifth metatarsal before the regular season began, putting him out for eight to ten weeks. Saravia made his debut for the club on 17 June in a 4–2 defeat to Syrianska FC. He replaced Lukas Sunesson in the 67th minute to see his first action since preseason. On 9 August, Saravia started for the first time for Frej. Away to Dalkurd FF, he went 73 minutes in a 3–2 defeat before being replaced by Mattias Bouvin. Saravia scored his first professional goal while with Frej, tallying on 18 August against Örgryte. After coming on as a substitute for Joakim Runnemo in the 75th minute, Saravia scored the final goal of a 3–1 victory for Frej in the 90+2’. Frej placed 14th in the Superettan and faced Akropolis IF in the relegation playoffs to avoid dropping down to Division 1. Saravia was named to the bench for both legs, but only appeared in the first leg. He replaced Dida Rashidi in the 82nd minute at Spånga IP, helping Frej to a 1–1 draw, then was an unused substitute at home as Frej stayed in the second tier, 1–1 on away goals. Saravia concluded his loan spell in Sweden having scored one goal in 12 appearances across all competitions.

Swope Park Rangers
On 8 January 2018, Sporting Kansas City announced Saravia was joining their USL club, Swope Park Rangers, on a free transfer. He would make 11 appearances for the club, scoring two goals and adding two assists. On 20 June 2018, the club announced they were transferring Saravia to Comunicaciones F.C. in Guatemala.

International career
Saravia has represented Guatemala at the U17, U20, and U23 levels. He was called up the U23 squad during 2015 CONCACAF Olympic Qualifying, as Guatemala were defeated by Costa Rica in the repechage playoff of the Central American Zone.

Saravia was called up to the Guatemala national team for the first time in summer 2015 as the only collegiate, non-professional player in the squad for a friendly match against the United States at LP Field in Nashville, Tennessee, and made the matchday roster, although he did not appear. He was again called up to the senior squad for a friendly against Honduras on 10 February 2016. Saravia started, making his senior international debut, and played the full 90 minutes of the 3–1 victory. He was the only foreign-based player in the squad as Guatemala head coach Walter Claverí prepared his team for upcoming 2018 World Cup qualifiers against the United States, Trinidad and Tobago and Saint Vincent and the Grenadines in the spring and summer of 2016. Saravia appeared in both games against the United States. The second of the home-and-home set was played at MAPFRE Stadium, making Saravia just the fourth Crew SC player to appear in an international match at the stadium. He also appeared against Trinidad and Tobago and Saint Vincent and the Grenadines, bringing his career total to four World Cup qualifying appearances in six total caps.

Saravia's international career was halted in 2016, when FIFA suspended the National Football Federation of Guatemala. The national team was barred from playing matches while the suspension was in effect.

Honours
Comunicaciones 
CONCACAF League: 2021
Liga Nacional de Guatemala: Clausura 2022

Career statistics

Club

International

References

External links
 FGCU profile
 Columbus profile
 Pittsburgh profile
 IK Frej profile 
 
 
 
 

1993 births
Living people
Sportspeople from Guatemala City
Guatemalan footballers
Guatemala international footballers
Association football midfielders
Florida Gulf Coast Eagles men's soccer players
Columbus Crew draft picks
Columbus Crew players
Pittsburgh Riverhounds SC players
IK Frej players
Sporting Kansas City II players
Comunicaciones F.C. players
Major League Soccer players
USL Championship players
Superettan players
Liga Nacional de Fútbol de Guatemala players
Guatemalan expatriate footballers
Expatriate footballers in Sweden
Expatriate soccer players in the United States
Guatemalan expatriate sportspeople in Sweden
Guatemalan expatriate sportspeople in the United States